Iceland competed at the 1980 Summer Paralympics in Arnhem, Netherlands. 12 competitors from Iceland won 2 medals, 1 gold and 1 bronze, and finished joint 31st in the medal table with Colombia.

Medalists

See also 
 Iceland at the Paralympics
 Iceland at the 1980 Summer Olympics

References 

1980
1980 in Icelandic sport
Nations at the 1980 Summer Paralympics